Frei is a former municipality in Møre og Romsdal county, Norway.  The  municipality existed from 1838 until its dissolution in 2008 when it was incorporated into Kristiansund Municipality.  It was located between the Kvernesfjorden and Freifjorden, primarily including the island of Frei and the smaller surrounding islands.

The administrative centre of the municipality was the village of Rensvik, the largest village on the island, located on the northern end of the island.  Other main villages that were in Frei Municipality include the village of Nedre Frei, located on the southern end of the island and the village of Kvalvåg, located on the eastern side of the island.  The main church for the municipality was Frei Church, located in the village of Nedre Frei.

History
The municipality of Fredø was established on 1 January 1838 (see formannskapsdistrikt law).  On 1 January 1882, a small part of Fredø (population: 40) was merged into the neighboring Øre Municipality to the south. On 1 September 1893, an area of Frei (population: 231) was merged into the new Gjemnes Municipality. In 1897, the Grip archipelago (population: 198) was separated from Frei to form the new Grip Municipality.

During the 1960s, there were many municipal mergers across Norway due to the work of the Schei Committee. On 1 January 1964, the northern part of the island of Frei (population: 884) was transferred from Bremsnes Municipality to Frei Municipality.  Also on the same date, the part of Frei on the island of Aspøya (population: 147) was transferred to the neighboring Tingvoll Municipality.  On 1 January 2008, Frei Municipality ceased to exist when it was merged into the neighboring Kristiansund Municipality to the north.

Coat of arms
The coat of arms was granted on 6 February 1987, and they were designed by local architect and painter Nils Fiske.  The two gold crowns on a red background symbolize the relationship between Frei and two Norwegian Kings: King Håkon the Good had a hunting lodge in the area in the 10th century, and the King and the villagers took part on the Battle of Rastarkalv in the municipality in 955. King Håkon VII has visited the village in 1955 at the 1000th anniversary of the battle.

Name
The municipality was named after the island of Frei. The meaning of the name is unknown, but is maybe derived from fríðr which means "good" or "beautiful". Until 1889, the name was written Fredø.

Churches
The Church of Norway had one parish within the municipality of Frei. It was part of the Ytre Nordmøre prosti (deanery) in the Diocese of Møre.

Government
The municipal council  of Frei was made up of representatives that were elected to four year terms.  The party breakdown of the final municipal council was as follows:

See also
List of former municipalities of Norway

References

Kristiansund
Nordmøre
Former municipalities of Norway
Populated places established in 1838
Populated places disestablished in 2008
1838 establishments in Norway
2008 disestablishments in Norway